Kujira may refer to tropical cyclones in the Pacific Ocean. The name Kujira means whale (Cetus) in Japanese.
 Typhoon Kujira (2003) (T0302, 02W, Amang), threatened the Philippines and Taiwan before approaching Japan.
 Typhoon Kujira (2009) (T0901, 01W, Dante), affected the Philippines before turning out to sea.
 Tropical Storm Kujira (2015) (T1508, 08W), formed in the South China Sea.
 Tropical Storm Kujira (2020) (T2013, 15W)

Pacific typhoon set index articles